Norman Wexler (August 16, 1926 – August 23, 1999) was an American screenwriter whose work included films such as Saturday Night Fever,  Serpico and Joe. A New Bedford, Massachusetts native and 1944 Central High School graduate in Detroit, Wexler attended Harvard University before moving to New York in 1951.

Career
Wexler wrote the screenplays for several hit films, most notably Joe, Serpico, Mandingo and Saturday Night Fever.  He received Oscar nominations for Joe and Serpico. According to Bob Zmuda, Saturday Night Fever made Wexler a wealthy man. He was a much sought-after script doctor, reworking the scripts for Lipstick and The Fan.

Wexler also was a serious and accomplished playwright. Several of his plays were produced off-Broadway and in regional theaters. His play The Rope was produced at Cafe La MaMa on New York, Red's My Color, What's Yours? won the Cleveland Playhouse Award, and his most recent work Forgive Me, Forgive Me Not was staged in Los Angeles in 1996, winning the Julie Harris Playwright Award, three years before his death.

Health, personal life, and character inspirations
He was reported to have suffered from severe mental illness, reportedly bipolar disorder, and was arrested in 1972 for threatening to shoot President Richard Nixon.

In the book Andy Kaufman Revealed, Bob Zmuda, Kaufman's friend and writer, relates his experiences working as an assistant for an extremely eccentric, Academy Award-nominated screenwriter, prone to pulling stunts that ranged from the bizarre to the profane. Zmuda refers to the man by the alias Mr X. Mr X's wild antics and boorish behavior are said to have been a major influence in creating Andy Kaufman's iconic alter-ego, the obnoxious lounge lizard Tony Clifton. Zmuda does not confirm Mr. X's identity in the book. However, on the WTF with Marc Maron podcast, he confirmed the long-standing rumor that it was Wexler.

His last manic episode, from November 1998 to February 1999, took a toll on his health.  Early in the morning of August 23, 1999, Wexler died of a heart attack at age 73.

Screenplays
 Joe (1970)
 Serpico (with Waldo Salt) (1973)
 Mandingo (1975)
 Drum (1976)
 Saturday Night Fever (1977)
 Staying Alive (with Sylvester Stallone) (1983)
 Raw Deal (with Gary DeVore) (1986)

References

External links

Michigan Jewish History, periodic publication

1926 births
1999 deaths
American male screenwriters
Harvard University alumni
People with bipolar disorder
People from New Bedford, Massachusetts
Screenwriters from Massachusetts
20th-century American male writers
20th-century American screenwriters
Central High School (Detroit) alumni